Novomoskovsky Administrative Okrug, is one of the twelve administrative okrugs of Moscow. The okrug was created on July 1, 2012.

The administrative center of Novomoskovsky Administrative Okrug is the town of Moskovsky.

Territorial organisation
At the time of formation it included the following 11 settlements, which previously belonged to Leninsky, Naro-Fominsky, and Podolsky Districts of Moscow Oblast:
 Moskovsky Settlement
 Shcherbinka Settlement
 Kokoshkino Settlement
 Desyonovskoye Settlement
 Filimonkovskoye Settlement
 Marushkinskoye Settlement
 Mosrentgen Settlement
 Ryazanovskoye Settlement
 Sosenskoye Settlement
 Vnukovskoye Settlement
 Voskresenskoye Settlement

References

External links
 

 
Administrative okrugs of Moscow